The 2022 season for the  is the 31st season in the team's existence and the 17th consecutive season as a UCI WorldTeam. French automobile manufacturer Citroën continues as a title sponsor for the second consecutive season alongside longtime title sponsor and French insurance firm AG2R La Mondiale. They use BMC bicycles, Campagnolo drivetrain, Campagnolo wheels and Rosti clothing.

Team roster 

Riders who joined the team for the 2022 season

Riders who left the team during or after the 2021 season

Season victories

National, Continental, and World Champions

Notes

References

External links 

 

2022 road cycling season by team
2022
2022 in French sport